Çavuşoğlu can refer to:

Surname 

 Mevlüt Çavuşoğlu

Places 
 Çavuşoğlu, Aziziye
 Çavuşoğlu, İskilip